Reinsurance is insurance that an insurance company purchases from another insurance company to insulate itself (at least in part) from the risk of a major claims event. With reinsurance, the company passes on ("cedes") some part of its own insurance liabilities to the other insurance company.  The company that purchases the reinsurance policy is called a "ceding company"  or "cedent" or "cedant" under most arrangements. The company issuing the reinsurance policy is referred to as the "reinsurer". In the classic case, reinsurance allows insurance companies to remain solvent after major claims events, such as major disasters like hurricanes and wildfires. In addition to its basic role in risk management, reinsurance is sometimes used to reduce the ceding company's capital requirements, or for tax mitigation or other purposes.

The reinsurer may be either a specialist reinsurance company, which only undertakes reinsurance business, or another insurance company. Insurance companies that accept reinsurance refer to the business as "assumed reinsurance".

There are two basic methods of reinsurance:
 Facultative Reinsurance, which is negotiated separately for each insurance policy that is reinsured. Facultative reinsurance is normally purchased by ceding companies for individual risks not covered, or insufficiently covered, by their reinsurance treaties, for amounts in excess of the monetary limits of their reinsurance treaties and for unusual risks. Underwriting expenses, and in particular personnel costs, are higher for such business because each risk is individually underwritten and administered. However, as they can separately evaluate each risk reinsured, the reinsurer's underwriter can price the contract more accurately to reflect the risks involved.
 Treaty Reinsurance means that the ceding company and the reinsurer negotiate and execute a reinsurance contract under which the reinsurer covers the specified share of all the insurance policies issued by the ceding company which come within the scope of that contract. The reinsurance contract may obligate the reinsurer to accept reinsurance of all contracts within the scope (known as "obligatory" reinsurance), or it may allow the insurer to choose which risks it wants to cede, with the reinsurer obligated to accept such risks (known as "facultative-obligatory" or "fac oblig" reinsurance). These types of contracts are typically long-term.

There are two main types of treaty reinsurance, proportional and non-proportional, which are detailed below. Under proportional reinsurance, the reinsurer's share of the risk is defined for each separate policy, while under non-proportional reinsurance the reinsurer's liability is based on the aggregate claims incurred by the ceding office. In the past 30 years there has been a major shift from proportional to non-proportional reinsurance in the property and casualty fields.

Functions 
Almost all insurance companies have a reinsurance program. The ultimate goal of that program is to reduce their exposure to loss by passing part of the risk of loss to a reinsurer or a group of reinsurers.

Risk transfer 
With reinsurance, the insurer can issue policies with higher limits than would otherwise be allowed, thus being able to take on more risk because some of that risk is now transferred to the re-insurer.

Income smoothing
Reinsurance can make an insurance company's results more predictable by absorbing large losses. This is likely to reduce the amount of capital needed to provide coverage. The risks are spread, with the reinsurer or reinsurers bearing some of the loss incurred by the insurance company. The income smoothing arises because the losses of the cedant are limited. This fosters stability in claim payouts and caps indemnification costs.

Surplus relief 
Proportional Treaties (or "pro-rata" treaties) provide the cedent with "surplus relief"; surplus relief being the capacity to write more business and/or at larger limits.

Arbitrage 
The insurance company may be motivated by arbitrage in purchasing reinsurance coverage at a lower rate than they charge the insured for the underlying risk, whatever the class of insurance.

In general, the reinsurer may be able to cover the risk at a lower premium than the insurer because:

The reinsurer may have some intrinsic cost advantage due to economies of scale or some other efficiency.
 Reinsurers may operate under weaker regulation than their clients. This enables them to use less capital to cover any risk, and to make less conservative assumptions when valuing the risk.
 Reinsurers may operate under a more favourable tax regime than their clients.
 Reinsurers will often have better access to underwriting expertise and to claims experience data, enabling them to assess the risk more accurately and reduce the need for contingency margins in pricing the risk
 Even if the regulatory standards are the same, the reinsurer may be able to hold smaller actuarial reserves than the cedant if it thinks the premiums charged by the cedant are excessively conservative.
 The reinsurer may have a more diverse portfolio of assets and especially liabilities than the cedant. This may create opportunities for hedging that the cedant could not exploit alone. Depending on the regulations imposed on the reinsurer, this may mean they can hold fewer assets to cover the risk.
 The reinsurer may have a greater risk appetite than the insurer.

Reinsurer's expertise 
The insurance company may want to avail itself of the expertise of a reinsurer, or the reinsurer's ability to set an appropriate premium, in regard to a specific (specialised) risk. The reinsurer will also wish to apply this expertise to the underwriting in order to protect their own interests. This is especially the case in Facultative Reinsurance.

Creating a manageable and profitable portfolio of insured risks 
By choosing a particular type of reinsurance method, the insurance company may be able to create a more balanced and homogeneous portfolio of insured risks. This would make its results more predictable on a net basis (i.e. allowing for the reinsurance). This is usually one of the objectives of reinsurance arrangements for the insurance companies.

Types of reinsurance

Proportional
Under proportional reinsurance, one or more reinsurers take a stated percentage share of each policy that an insurer issues ("writes"). The reinsurer will then receive that stated percentage of the premiums and will pay the stated percentage of claims. In addition, the reinsurer will allow a "ceding commission" to the insurer to cover the costs incurred by the ceding insurer (mainly acquisition and administration, as well as the expected profit that the cedant is giving up).

The arrangement may be "quota share" or "surplus reinsurance" (also known as surplus of line or variable quota share treaty) or a combination of the two. Under a quota share arrangement, a fixed percentage (say 75%) of each insurance policy is reinsured. Under a surplus share arrangement, the ceding company decides on a "retention limit": say $100,000. The ceding company retains the full amount of each risk, up to a maximum of $100,000 per policy or per risk, and the excess over this retention limit is reinsured.

The ceding company may seek a quota share arrangement for several reasons. First, it may not have sufficient capital to prudently retain all of the business that it can sell. For example, it may only be able to offer a total of $100 million in coverage, but by reinsuring 75% of it, it can sell four times as much, and retain some of the profits on the additional business via the ceding commission.

The ceding company may seek surplus reinsurance to limit the losses it might incur from a small number of large claims as a result of random fluctuations in experience. In a 9 line surplus treaty the reinsurer would then accept up to $900,000 (9 lines). So if the insurance company issues a policy for $100,000, they would keep all of the premiums and losses from that policy. If they issue a $200,000 policy, they would give (cede) half of the premiums and losses to the reinsurer (1 line each). The maximum automatic underwriting capacity of the cedant would be $1,000,000 in this example. Any policy larger than this would require facultative reinsurance.

Non-proportional
Under non-proportional reinsurance the reinsurer only pays out if the total claims suffered by the insurer in a given period exceed a stated amount, which is called the "retention" or "priority". For instance the insurer may be prepared to accept a total loss up to $1 million, and purchases a layer of reinsurance of $4 million in excess of this $1 million. If a loss of $3 million were then to occur, the insurer would bear $1 million of the loss and would recover $2 million from its reinsurer. In this example, the insurer also retains any excess of loss over $5 million unless it has purchased a further excess layer of reinsurance.

The main forms of non-proportional reinsurance are excess of loss and stop loss.

Excess of loss reinsurance can have three forms - "Per Risk XL" (Working XL), "Per Occurrence or Per Event XL" (Catastrophe or Cat XL), and "Aggregate XL".

In per risk, the cedant's insurance policy limits are greater than the reinsurance retention. For example, an insurance company might insure commercial property risks with policy limits up to $10 million, and then buy per risk reinsurance of $5 million in excess of $5 million. In this case a loss of $6 million on that policy will result in the recovery of $1 million from the reinsurer. These contracts usually contain event limits to prevent their misuse as a substitute for Catastrophe XLs.

In catastrophe excess of loss, the cedant's retention is usually a multiple of the underlying policy limits, and the reinsurance contract usually contains a two risk warranty (i.e. they are designed to protect the cedant against catastrophic events that involve more than one policy, usually very many policies). For example, an insurance company issues homeowners' policies with limits of up to $500,000 and then buys catastrophe reinsurance of $22,000,000 in excess of $3,000,000. In that case, the insurance company would only recover from reinsurers in the event of multiple policy losses in one event (e.g., hurricane, earthquake, flood).

Aggregate XL affords a frequency protection to the reinsured. For instance if the company retains $1 million net any one vessel, $5 million annual aggregate limit in excess of $5m annual aggregate deductible, the cover would equate to 5 total losses (or more partial losses) in excess of 5 total losses (or more partial losses). Aggregate covers can also be linked to the cedant's gross premium income during a 12-month period, with limit and deductible expressed as percentages and amounts. Such covers are then known as "stop loss" contracts.

Risks attaching basis
A basis under which reinsurance is provided for claims arising from policies commencing during the period to which the reinsurance
relates. The insurer knows there is coverage during the whole policy period even if claims are only discovered or made later on.

All claims from cedant underlying policies inception during the period of the reinsurance contract are covered even if they occur after the expiration date of the reinsurance contract. Any claims from cedant underlying policies incepting outside the period of the reinsurance contract are not covered even if they occur during the period of the reinsurance contract.

Losses occurring basis
A Reinsurance treaty under which all claims occurring during the period of the contract, irrespective of when the underlying policies incepted, are covered. Any losses occurring after the contract expiration date are not covered.

As opposed to claims-made or risks attaching contracts. Insurance coverage is provided for losses occurring in the defined period. This is the usual basis of cover for short tail business.

Claims-made basis
A policy which covers all claims reported to an insurer within the policy period irrespective of when they occurred.

Contracts
Most of the above examples concern reinsurance contracts that cover more than one policy (treaty). Reinsurance can also be purchased on a per policy basis, in which case it is known as facultative reinsurance. Facultative reinsurance can be written on either a quota share or excess of loss basis. Facultative reinsurance contracts are commonly memorialized in relatively brief contracts known as facultative certificates and often are used for large or unusual risks that do not fit within standard reinsurance treaties due to their exclusions. The term of a facultative agreement coincides with the term of the policy. Facultative reinsurance is usually purchased by the insurance underwriter who underwrote the original insurance policy, whereas treaty reinsurance is typically purchased by a senior executive at the insurance company.

The reinsurer's liability will usually cover the whole lifetime of the original insurance, once it is written. However the question arises of when either party can choose to cease the reinsurance in respect of future new business. Reinsurance treaties can either be written on a "continuous" or "term" basis. A continuous contract has no predetermined end date, but generally either party can give 90 days notice to cancel or amend the treaty for new business. A term agreement has a built-in expiration date. It is common for insurers and reinsurers to have long-term relationships that span many years. Reinsurance treaties are typically longer documents than facultative certificates, containing many of their own terms that are distinct from the terms of the direct insurance policies that they reinsure. However, even most reinsurance treaties are relatively short documents considering the number and variety of risks and lines of business that the treaties reinsure and the dollars involved in the transactions. They rely heavily on industry practice. There are not "standard" reinsurance contracts. However, many reinsurance contracts do include some commonly used provisions and provisions imbued with considerable industry common and practice.

Fronting

Sometimes insurance companies wish to offer insurance in jurisdictions where they are not licensed, or where it considers that local regulations are too onerous: for example, an insurer may wish to offer an insurance programme to a multinational company, to cover property and liability risks in many countries around the world. In such situations, the insurance company may find a local insurance company which is authorised in the relevant country, arrange for the local insurer to issue an insurance policy covering the risks in that country, and enter into a reinsurance contract with the local insurer to transfer the risks to itself. In the event of a loss, the policyholder would claim against the local insurer under the local insurance policy, the local insurer would pay the claim and would claim reimbursement under the reinsurance contract. Such an arrangement is called "fronting". Fronting is also sometimes used where an insurance buyer requires its insurers to have a certain financial strength rating and the prospective insurer does not satisfy that requirement: the prospective insurer may be able to persuade another insurer, with the requisite credit rating, to provide the coverage to the insurance buyer, and to take out reinsurance in respect of the risk. An insurer which acts as a "fronting insurer" receives a fronting fee for this service to cover administration and the potential default of the reinsurer. The fronting insurer is taking a risk in such transactions, because it has an obligation to pay its insurance claims even if the reinsurer becomes insolvent and fails to reimburse the claims.

Many reinsurance placements are not placed with a single reinsurer but are shared between a number of reinsurers. For example, a $30,000,000 excess of $20,000,000 layer may be shared by 30 or more reinsurers. The reinsurer who sets the terms (premium and contract conditions) for the reinsurance contract is called the lead reinsurer; the other companies subscribing to the contract are called following reinsurers. Alternatively, one reinsurer can accept the whole of the reinsurance and then retrocede it (pass it on in a further reinsurance arrangement) to other companies.

Using game-theoretic modeling, Professors Michael R. Powers (Temple University) and Martin Shubik (Yale University) have argued that the number of active reinsurers in a given national market should be approximately equal to the square-root of the number of primary insurers active in the same market. Econometric analysis has provided empirical support for the Powers-Shubik rule.

Ceding companies often choose their reinsurers with great care as they are exchanging insurance risk for credit risk. Risk managers monitor reinsurers' financial ratings (S&P, A.M. Best, etc.) and aggregated exposures regularly.

Because of the governance effect insurance/cedent companies can have on society, reinsurers can indirectly have societal impact as well, due to reinsurer underwriting and claims philosophies imposed on those underlying carriers which affects how the cedents offer coverage in the market. However, reinsurer governance is voluntarily accepted by cedents via contract to allow cedents the opportunity to rent reinsurer capital to expand cedent market share or limit their risk.

See also
 
Assumption reinsurance
Catastrophe bond
Catastrophe modeling
Financial reinsurance
Industry Loss Warranties
Life insurance securitization
Reinsurance sidecar
Stop-loss insurance

References

External links 

 Captive Review Captive Review
 Reinsurance, by Gary Patrick 

 Youtube: "What is Reinsurance?", by Sebastian Lischewski

 
Actuarial science